Hearcel F. Craig (born July 1, 1949) is an American politician serving as the Senator for the 15th District of the Ohio State Senate. Craig formerly served in the United States Army and then had a career with the Ohio Department of Youth Services.  He then went on to help develop City Year in Columbus.  He has a degree from Central Michigan University. In 2007, Craig was appointed to serve on Columbus City Council. While on Council, Craig rose to serve as President Pro Tempore.

In 2014, Craig decided to run for the Ohio House of Representatives to replace Tracy Maxwell Heard, who was term limited. He won the primary over Heard's husband, Howard Heard.  He went on to defeat Republican Dustin Pyles 76%-24%. He was elected to a 2nd term in the Ohio House of Representatives in 2016. In 2018, Craig decided to seek the nomination for Ohio's 15th State Senate District. The incumbent, Charleta Tavares, was term limited and unable to seek re-election. Craig won both the primary and general elections, and took office on January 6, 2019.

Ohio State Senate 
In 2018, instead of seeking re-election, Craig decided to seek the nomination for Ohio's 15th State Senate District. The incumbent Senator, Charleta Tavares, was term-limited and unable to seek re-election. Craig won both primary and general elections, and took office on January 6, 2019.

In 2021, Craig was elected as Assistant Minority Whip for the Ohio Senate Democratic Caucus.

Committee assignments 

 Committee on Government Oversight & Reform (Ranking Member)
 Insurance (Ranking Member)
 Energy & Public Utilities
 Finance
Financial Institutions & Technology

Electoral history

References

1949 births
Living people
Democratic Party members of the Ohio House of Representatives
United States Army soldiers
Central Michigan University alumni
Columbus City Council members
21st-century American politicians
African-American state legislators in Ohio
Democratic Party Ohio state senators
21st-century African-American politicians
20th-century African-American people